The 1983 Speedway World Pairs Championship was the fourteenth FIM Speedway World Pairs Championship. The final took place on 18 June at the Ullevi Stadium in Göteborg, Sweden.

England won their sixth World Pairs Championship after Kenny Carter and Peter Collins scored 25 points. Australia, represented by Billy Sanders and Gary Guglielmi finished second on 24 points, while the two men who would go on to dominate Motorcycle Speedway for the next six years, Hans Nielsen and Erik Gundersen, rode Denmark to third place with 19 points.

Heading into Heat 16 of the Final, Billy Sanders was the only unbeaten rider. He won the start from Guglielmi and out of form West German pair Egon Müller and Karl Maier when he unbelievably fell in turn 2 of the first lap. Although Guglielmi went on to win the re-run of the heat, the points lost as a result of Sanders exclusion ultimately cost Australia its first (and only) World Pairs Championship. While Australian referee Sam Bass had no hesitation in excluding Sanders, he had earlier allowed Peter Collins to re-start after video replays suggested that he fell with no help in the first turn of Heat 10 against Denmark. England went on to a 5-0 score in the heat after Nielsen was excluded from the re-start for falling off his bike over the tapes and Gundersen suffered engine failure a lap from the flag while leading the race.

Defending champions Dennis Sigalos and Bobby Schwartz (USA), who had won the 1982 Pairs Championship at the Liverpool City Raceway in Sydney, Australia with a maximum score of 30 points, finished fourth with 18 points. The USA had also won the World Pairs in 1981 with Bruce Penhall and Schwartz.

Preliminary round
  Ljubljana

Semifinal 1
  Wrocław, Olympic Stadium
 June 5

Semifinal 2
  Bremen
 June 5

World final
  Göteborg, Ullevi
 June 18
 Referee:  Sam Bass

See also
 1983 Individual Speedway World Championship
 1983 Speedway World Team Cup
 motorcycle speedway
 1983 in sports

References

1983
World Pairs
Speedway World Pairs
Speedway World Pairs Championship